Dorothy Sarkis Morkis (born December 29, 1942, in Boston) is an American equestrian. She placed fifth in individual dressage, and won a bronze medal in team dressage at the 1976 Summer Olympics in Montreal.

References

External links

1942 births
Living people
Sportspeople from Boston
American female equestrians
American dressage riders
Olympic bronze medalists for the United States in equestrian
Equestrians at the 1976 Summer Olympics
Medalists at the 1976 Summer Olympics
Equestrians at the 1975 Pan American Games
Pan American Games gold medalists for the United States
Pan American Games bronze medalists for the United States
Pan American Games medalists in equestrian
Medalists at the 1975 Pan American Games
21st-century American women